Bjørn Richard Sundquist (born 16 June 1948) is a Norwegian actor, famous for TV, theatre, and movie roles.

For many years he worked at Det Norske Teatret and Nationaltheateret in Oslo, and he is especially famous for the roles as Merlin and Hamlet.

When he received the Honorary Amanda Award (Norway's answer to Oscar) in 2000, he became the youngest ever recipient of the greatest honor in Norwegian film. He was 52 at the time and only a few months younger than Liv Ullmann, who received the honorary award in 1992.

He is of Sami heritage on his mother's side (a minority originating mainly from the northern parts of the Scandinavian peninsula often referred to as Sápmi). He has had several TV-roles for both NRK, the biggest Norwegian television channel, and Norway's largest commercial channel, TV2. Sundquist has been awarded both a Gullruten and an Amanda award for his leading role as police chief Inspector Konrad Sejer in the television miniseries Sejer.

Sundquist is humorously said to appear in every single Norwegian movie, due to his popularity and versatility.

Filmography: actor

 Ragnarok (TV series) (2020) 
 Hansel and Gretel: Witch Hunters (2013)
 Beyond the Border (2011) 
 A Somewhat Gentle Man (2010)
 Tomme Tønner (2010)
 Karl III (2009) TV series
 Jernanger (2009) 
 Dead Snow (2009) (a.k.a. Død Snø)
 Kautokeino-opprøret (2008)
 An Immortal Man (2006) as Reimann
 Sejer - Svarte sekunder (2006) (mini) TV miniseries
 Min misunnelige frisør (2004)
 The Homolulu Show (2004)
 Ørnen: En krimi-odyssé (2004) Tv series
 Asfaltevangeliet (2004)
 Sejer - Elskede Poona (2003) (mini) TV series
 The Pledge (2003)
 Loose Ends (2003)
 Jonny Vang (2003)
 Pelle politibil (2002) 
 Sejer - Djevelen holder lyset (2002) TV miniseries
 Himmelfall (2002)
 Cowboys Don't Cry (2002) 
 I Am Dina (2002)
 Endelig fredag (2002) TV series
 Nini (2001) TV series
 Amatørene (2001)
 Sleepwalker (2000)
 Evas øye (1999)
 Tørst - Framtidens forbrytelser (1999)
 Sejer - se deg ikke tilbake (1999) (mini) TV series
 1732 Høtten (1998)
 Åpen post (1998) TV Series
 Thranes metode (1998)
 Tann for Tann (1998) 
 Hammarkullen (1997) TV miniseries
 Salige er de som tørster (1997) 
 Blind gudinne (1997) TV series 
 Mendel (1997)
 Budbringeren (1997)
 Sagojoga minister (1997) 
 Pust på meg! (1997)
 Søndagsengler (1996)
 Kjærlighetens kjøtere (1995)
 Pan (1995) 
 Noe beroligende (1995)
 Ti kniver i hjertet (1994)
 Trollsyn (1994)
 Drømspel (1994)
 Brødrene Dal og legenden om Atlant-Is (1994) TV series
 Secondløitnanten (1993)
 Telegrafisten (1993)
 Pelle politibil (1993) TV series
 Svarte pantere (1992)
 Krigerens hjerte (1992) 
 For dagene er onde (1991) 
 Fedrelandet (1991) (mini) TV series
 Gränslots (1990)
 Haakon Haakonsen (1990)
 Døden på Oslo S (1990)
 Håndfull tid, En (1990)
 Dykket (1989)
 Sweetwater (1988)
 Etter Rubicon (1987)
 På stigende kurs (1987)
 Over grensen (1987), based on the Feldmann case
 Nattseilere (1986)
 Skal det vere ein dans? (1986) TV series
 Havlandet (1985)
 Gulag (1985) (TV)
 Galskap! (1985)
 Noe helt annet (1985)
 Høvdingen (1984)
 Spyship (1983) (mini) TV series
 Engler i sneen (1982)
 Kronprinsen (1979) 
 Rallarblod (1979)

References

External links

1948 births
Living people
Norwegian male stage actors
Norwegian male film actors
Norwegian male television actors
People from Hammerfest